Vensim is a simulation software developed by Ventana Systems. It primarily supports continuous simulation (system dynamics), with some discrete event and agent-based modelling capabilities. It is available commercially and as a free "Personal Learning Edition".

Modeling environment 

Vensim provides a graphical modeling interface with stock and flow and causal loop diagrams, on top of a text-based system of equations in a declarative programming language. It includes a patented method for interactive tracing of behavior through causal links in model structure, as well as a language extension for automating quality control experiments on models called Reality Check.

The modeling language supports arrays (subscripts) and permits mapping among dimensions and aggregation. Built-in allocation functions satisfy constraints that are sometimes not met by conventional approaches like logit. It supports discrete delays, queues and a variety of stochastic processes.

There are multiple paths for cross sectional and time-series data import and export, including text files, spreadsheets and ODBC. Models may be calibrated against data using optimization, Kalman Filtering or Markov chain Monte Carlo methods. Sensitivity analysis options provide a variety of ways to test and sample models, including Monte Carlo simulation with Latin Hypercube sampling.

Vensim model files can be packaged and published in a customizable read-only format that can be executed by a freely available Model Reader. This allows sharing of interactive models with users who do not own the program and/or who the model author does not wish to have access to the model's code base.

Applications 

Vensim is general-purpose software, used in a wide variety of problem domains. Common or high-profile applications include:
 Transportation and Energy
 Business Strategy
 Health
 Security and Terrorism
 Project Management
 Marketing Science in Pharmaceuticals and Consumer Products
 Logistics
 Environment

See also

 Comparison of system dynamics software
 Computer simulation
 List of computer simulation software
 Monte Carlo simulation

References

External links 
 Official Vensim web site
 Official Ventana Systems, Inc. web site
 Exploratory Modelling and Analysis (EMA) Workbench
 SDM-doc documentation tool
 Forio.com - host for online Vensim models

Environmental science software
Mathematical software
Numerical software
Probabilistic software
Risk management software
Science software for macOS
Science software for Windows
Scientific simulation software
Simulation programming languages
Simulation software